County Route 550 (CR 550) is a county highway in the U.S. state of New Jersey. The highway extends  from Delsea Drive (Route 47) in Maurice River Township to Shore Drive (U.S. Route 9) in Dennis Township. The road travels through Maurice River Township (Cumberland County), Dennis Township (Cape May County) and Woodbine.

Route description 

CR 550 begins at an intersection with Route 47 in Maurice River Township, Cumberland County, heading east on two-lane undivided Leesburg-Belleplain Road. The road runs through dense woods with pockets of farms, crossing Route 347 before running through the Belleplain State Forest. CR 550 enters Dennis Township in Cape May County and becomes Hoffmans Mill Road. The road passes areas of farm fields and homes as it reaches the CR 550 Spur junction and makes a turn northeast onto Tuckahoe Road. A short distance later, the route turns southeast onto Webster Avenue, with CR 605 continuing north on Tuckahoe Road.  CR 550 heads into heavy woodland again as it continues into Woodbine. In Woodbine, the route passes residences as it reaches the CR 557 intersection.

At this point, CR 550 turns northeast to form a concurrency with CR 557 on Washington Avenue while CR 638 continues east on Webster Avenue. The road passes a mix of homes and businesses as it comes to Dehirsch Avenue, where CR 550 splits from CR 557 by heading southeast on that road. CR 550 continues through developed areas, with the surroundings becoming more rural as the route intersects CR 660 and passes under the Cape May Seashore Lines railroad before passing north of Woodbine Municipal Airport. After meeting CR 610 at a roundabout, the road enters dense woodland and crosses back into Dennis Township, with the name becoming Woodbine-Ocean View Road.  The route crosses CR 608 and CR 628, continuing into wooded residential areas at the intersection with the latter. CR 550 continues from this point to its eastern terminus at US 9.

Major intersections

CR 550 Spur 

County Route 550 Spur, abbreviated CR 550 Spur, is a county highway in the U.S. state of New Jersey. The highway extends  from Delsea Drive (Route 47) to Hoffman's Mill Road (CR 550) in Dennis Township. Between the two termini, the route passes through a portion of Maurice River Township.

The road travels through the following municipalities (from west to east):
Dennis Township (Cape May County)
Maurice River Township (Cumberland County)

Major intersections

See also

References

External links 

New Jersey 5xx Routes (Dan Moraseski)
CR 550 pictures

550
550
550